The 2015 Open d'Orléans was a professional tennis tournament played on hard courts. It was the eleventh edition of the tournament which was part of the 2015 ATP Challenger Tour. It took place in Orléans, France, between 28 September and 4 October 2015.

Singles main-draw entrants

Seeds

 1 Rankings are as of September 21, 2014.

Other entrants
The following players received wildcards into the singles main draw:
  Grégoire Barrère
  Enzo Couacaud
  Jaume Munar
  Alexandre Sidorenko

The following player received entry with a protected ranking:
  Marco Chiudinelli

The following players received entry as a special exempt into the singles main draw:
  Franko Škugor

The following players received entry from the qualifying draw:
  Filip Veger
  Maxime Tabatroung
  Maxime Teixeira
  Yann Marti

Champions

Singles

 Jan-Lennard Struff def.  Jerzy Janowicz, 5–7, 6–4, 6–3

Doubles

 Tristan Lamasine /  Fabrice Martin def.  Ken Skupski /  Neal Skupski, 6–4, 7–5

External links
Official Website